Willard Raymond Schmidt (May 29, 1928 – March 22, 2007) was an American professional baseball player, a pitcher who played in Major League Baseball between 1952 and 1959. He was born in Hays, Kansas. His four grandparents were Volga Germans.

He reached the majors in 1952 with the St. Louis Cardinals, spending part of six years with them (1952–53, 1955–57) before moving to the Cincinnati Redlegs (1958–59) in the same transaction that brought Curt Flood to St. Louis. His most productive season came in 1957 with the Cardinals, when he set a 10–3 mark and led the National League pitchers with a .769 W-L %. He was inducted into the Kansas Baseball Hall of Fame in 1989.

In a seven-season career, Schmidt posted a 31–29 record with 323 strikeouts and a 3.93 ERA in 194 appearances, including 55 starts, 11 complete games, one shutout, two saves, and 586 innings pitched.

See also
St. Louis Cardinals all-time roster

References

External links

Willard Schmidt - Baseballbiography.com
Historic Baseball

1928 births
2007 deaths
Allentown Cardinals players
American people of German-Russian descent
Atlanta Crackers players
Baseball players from Kansas
Charleston Marlins players
Cincinnati Redlegs players
Cincinnati Reds players
Columbus Red Birds players
Dallas Rangers players
Hamilton Cardinals players
Houston Buffaloes players
Major League Baseball pitchers
Omaha Cardinals players
People from Hays, Kansas
Rochester Red Wings players
St. Louis Cardinals players
San Juan Marlins players
Seattle Rainiers players